Amer Khammash, (born 14 November 1924, in Al-Salt, Transjordan) was a Jordanian Lieutenant General, political and personal adviser to King Hussein of Jordan as well as being His Majesty's Special representative, and being the Chief of The Royal Hashemite Court twice. Along with being a member of the Senate of Jordan for five different terms.

Biography
He was the son of a lawyer and judge "Mohammad Baseem" Khammash, who was well known for being the country's first court judge. Amongst his achievements, General Khammash was the first recognized Jordanian pilot and received his pilot training in RAF Middle Wallop in the United Kingdom in 1949, and received his wings in 1950 from the Late Founder of Jordan, King Abdullah I. He returned to Jordan and later attended United States Army Command and General Staff College in Fort Leavenworth, Kansas in 1958, where his portrait hangs in The Hall of Fame in the Staff College.

After graduating from the College he returned to Jordan and was promoted to General Chief of Staff in 1967 after the Six-Day War. Following this he held various high ranking positions such as: Minister of Defence, Personal Representative of his Majesty King Hussein, Minister of the Royal Hashemite Court, and Personal and Political Advisor to His Majesty King Hussein until he was appointed to the Upper House of the Parliament of Jordan in 1988. He held this position until the year 2000.

General Khammash died after a short illness in Amman, Jordan on 13 February 2010 at the age of 85. He was given a full military funeral in Jordan, which was televised throughout the Middle East, and was survived by his two sons Mazen and Maher, daughter Suzi, 9 grandchildren, and 6 great-grandchildren.

Awards and decorations
Amongst his many achievements and medals that he received in his well-accomplished career, the most notable were the Légion d'honneur, the highest-ranking French decoration, which was awarded to him by President Charles De Gaulle of France. Queen Elizabeth II also presented him with an Associate Knighthood of the Venerable Order of St John. He was also awarded the highest honor medals from King Hussein bin Talal for duties to his country: Grand Cordon (1st class) of the Order of Independence, Grand Cordon (1st class) of the Order of the Star of Jordan and Grand Cordon with Brilliants of the Supreme Order of the Renaissance. He also received the Vatican Medal from Pope John Paul II and many other Medals from various Arab and International Leaders. During his career, General Khammash met numerous Heads of State including every U.S President starting with Dwight D. Eisenhower in 1958 and culminating with President Bill Clinton in 1992.

Honours
 :
  Grand Cordon with Brilliants of the Supreme Order of the Renaissance
  Grand Cordon of the Order of the Star of Jordan
  Grand Cordon of the Order of Independence
  Grand Cordon of the Order of Military Merit
  Recipient of the Long Service Medal
  Recipient of the Medal for Participation in the Battle of Karameh
  Recipient of the Silver Jubilee of Hussein bin Talal
 Recipient of the Medal for Joint Military Operations 1942 (Iraq and Syria Campaign Medal)
 Recipient of the Medal for the 1939-1945 War (World War II Campaign Medal)
 Recipient of the Medal for Military Operations in Palestine 1948
 :
  Grand Cross of the Order of Merit of the Federal Republic of Germany
 :
  Knight Grand Cross of the Order of Isabella the Catholic (gcYC)
 :
  Associate Knight of Grace of the Most Venerable Order of the Hospital of St. John of Jerusalem (KStJ)
  Recipient of the 1939-1945 Star
  Recipient of the Defence Medal
  Recipient of the War Medal 1939-1945
  Recipient of the General Service Medal (1918)
 :
  Commander of the Legion of Merit

External links 
 Prime Ministry of Jordan website
 Ammon News Article

References

1924 births
2010 deaths
People from Al-Salt
Jordanian generals
Jordanian aviators
Non-U.S. alumni of the Command and General Staff College
Government ministers of Jordan
Defence ministers of Jordan
Transport ministers of Jordan
Members of the Senate of Jordan
Recipients of the Legion of Honour
Knights of the Order of St John
Recipients of the Order of Independence (Jordan)
Recipients of the Order of Merit of the Federal Republic of Germany